The 2017 Sudirman Cup (officially known as the  2017 Total BWF Sudirman Cup for sponsorship reasons) was the 15th edition of the Sudirman Cup, the biennial international badminton championship contested by the mixed national teams of the member associations of Badminton World Federation (BWF), since its inception in 1989. The tournament was hosted by Gold Coast, Australia, between 21 and 28 May 2017. It was the first time this event was hosted outside Asia and Europe since its establishment in 1989.

The matches was played at Carrara Sports and Leisure Centre. It was the first time that Australia had hosted the tournament and the first time this event is hosted outside Asia and Europe since its establishment in 1989.

China was the defending champion. Korea defeated China 3–2 to win the tournament, which became the first Sudirman Cup title for Korea after 2003.

Host city selection
Glasgow and Gold Coast submitted bids to host 2017 Sudirman Cup. Gold Coast was announced as the host for 2017 Sudirman Cup, while Glasgow later awarded the 2017 BWF World Championships.

Seedings
The seedings for 32 teams competing in the tournament were released on 2 March 2017. It was based on aggregated points from the best players in the world ranking. The tournament was divided into four groups, with twelve teams in the elite group competing for the title. Eight teams were seeded into second and third groups and four remaining teams were seeded into fourth group.

On the day of the draw, it was announced that the original list of 32 teams was pared down to 28, with four teams – Mexico, Netherlands, Spain and Sweden were withdrawing from the tournament. The 28 participating teams were divided into four groups, with Group 1 consisting of the 12 teams that will compete for the title. Group 2 and Group 3 (eight teams each) will fight for overall placings. The draw was held on 17 March 2017. England withdrew from the Sudirman Cup on 4 April 2017.

Group composition

Squads

Group stage

Group 1A 

|-

|-

|-

|}

Group 1B 

|-

|-

|-

|}

Group 1C 

|-

|-

|-

|}

Group 1D 

|-

|-

|-

|}

Group 2A

|-

|-

|-

|-

|-

|-

|}

Group 2B

|-

|-

|-

|-

|-

|-

|}

Group 3A

|-

|-

|-

|}

Group 3B

|-

|-

|-

|-

|-

|-

|}

Knockout stage

Classification bracket

Classification round

|-

|-

|-

|-

|-

|-

|-

|}

Final draw
The draw for the quarterfinals will be held after the completion of the final matches in the group stage on 24 May 2017.

Final bracket

Quarter-finals

|-

|-

|-

|-

|}

Semi-finals

|-

|-

|}

Final

|-

|}

Final ranking

References

External links
Official website
Tournament Link

2017
Sudirman Cup
Sudirman Cup
Badminton tournaments in Australia
International sports competitions hosted by Australia
Sport on the Gold Coast, Queensland
Sudirman Cup